Blue's Treasure Hunt is a 1999 educational video game developed and published by Humongous Entertainment, based on the Blue's Clues television series. It is based on the Blue's Clues episode "Blue's Big Treasure Hunt".

Plot and gameplay
The premise of the game revolves around a treasure hunt, where the player helps Blue and her friend Steve find hidden objects. The gameplay involves a point-and-click adventure game interface.

Commercial performance 
According to PC Data, the game was the 9th Top Selling Home Education software for the week of 5/28/2000-6/3/2000. The game's interface and other attributes generally received praise.

References

1999 video games
Humongous Entertainment games
Video games developed in the United States

Point-and-click adventure games
Single-player video games
Classic Mac OS games
Nick Jr. video games
Children's educational video games
Video games about dogs
Video games featuring female protagonists
Windows games